William Cousins may refer to:

 William Cousins (judge) (1927–2018), American lawyer, judge, and member of the Chicago City Council
 William Edward Cousins (1902–1988), American Roman Catholic archbishop
 William J. Cousins (1924–2013), American sociologist
 William Roy Cousins, Sr. (1881–1976), American politician